Luke McCormack (born 8 June 1995) is a British amateur boxer who is affiliated with Birtley ABC. He won a silver medal in the 2017 European Championships.

In May 2019, McCormack was selected to compete at the 2019 European Games in Minsk, Belarus. He also competed at the 2019 World Championships in Yekaterinburg, Russia, where he lost by split decision (3:2) to Leonel de los Santos in the third round.

He is the twin brother of fellow boxer Pat McCormack.

Notes

References

1995 births
Living people
British male boxers
Sportspeople from Sunderland
Commonwealth Games medallists in boxing
Commonwealth Games bronze medallists for England
Boxers at the 2018 Commonwealth Games
Boxers at the 2015 European Games
Boxers at the 2019 European Games
European Games medalists in boxing
European Games bronze medalists for Great Britain
Light-welterweight boxers
Boxers at the 2020 Summer Olympics
Olympic boxers of Great Britain
Medallists at the 2018 Commonwealth Games